White Owl (also Whiteowl) is an unincorporated rural village in east central Meade County, South Dakota, United States, with a population of 61 as of the 2010 census. The village has a fashion boutique, a Baptist church, a Community Center, a graveyard, and a post office, with the ZIP code of 57792.

The community took its name from nearby White Owl Creek.

References

Unincorporated communities in Meade County, South Dakota
Unincorporated communities in South Dakota